The L. S. Good House or Good Mansion is a historic home located in Wheeling, Ohio County, West Virginia.  It was built in 1904 and was placed in the National Register singularly on November 28, 1988, and as part of the East Wheeling Historic District on November 22, 1999.

History

L. S. Good
Lippmann Gut was born in Gailingen am Hochrhein, Germany in 1855 to German speaking Jewish parents. He emigrated to America in 1873 at the age of eighteen. He arrived in Galveston, Texas with no possessions or funds. Shortly after arriving he changed his name to Lee Samuel Good to sound more native. He moved to Wheeling (it is claimed he walked there), where he opened a business, and became a naturalized citizen in 1879. His business sold imported and domestic dry goods, oils, fabrics and carpets.  The store was located on Main Street in the Cotton Building but moved further down Main Street after the turn of the century.

Good married Fannie Rothchild in 1889. They had three children:

 Bertha Good Iglauer (1890, Wheeling – 1982, Cleveland, OH)
 Samuel Lee Good (September 22, 1894 – 1983)
 Sidney Good

The house
He built his new house on 14th Street in 1904 at a cost of $7,000 in the midst of his new fortune. Good employed Millard F. Giesey, a Wheeling architect to construct his lavish residence. Giesey had already established his name in Wheeling in the later years of the 19th Century with architect Edward B. Franzheim and constructed a wide variety of buildings and homes stretching across a wide portion of West Virginia.

The home was completed in 1905 and Good spent another 22 years in residence until his death in 1927. During those years he would entertain his employees with parties at his home and donated freely though anonymously as he wanted the donations to be discreet. Wheeling Park received most of his charity and its twin man-made lakes are credited to Good's funding. When Good died nearly every store in Wheeling closed for his funeral out of respect for the prominent city leader.

The house passed to one of Good's sons, Samuel Lee Good, who continued his father's charity work and served on the Wheeling Park Commission from 1933 to 1972. Another son, Sidney, directed his father's business. Samuel lived in the house until 1920.

The house is currently owned by Dominick Cerrone, who operates Good Mansion Wines out of the historic home.

Appearance
The Good Mansion is a three-story Classical Revival style brick townhouse.  It features a full-width porch with pairs and clusters of fluted wooden columns on sandstone plinths. The third story facade has an engaged Ionic order brick colonnade. It has a sumptuous interior.

References

Houses completed in 1904
Houses in Wheeling, West Virginia
Houses on the National Register of Historic Places in West Virginia
Individually listed contributing properties to historic districts on the National Register in West Virginia
National Register of Historic Places in Wheeling, West Virginia
Neoclassical architecture in West Virginia